Christian Joseph Morata Bautista (born October 19, 1981) is a Filipino singer, actor, host, and model. He was a finalist of Star in a Million, a Philippine reality show aired on ABS-CBN channel, winning 4th place in the competition in 2003. After the contest, he signed a recording contract with Warner Music Philippines and released his self-titled debut album, Christian Bautista. The multi-platinum album established his name as an OPM artist with songs such as "The Way You Look at Me", "Colour Everywhere" and "Hands to Heaven". The singer gained popularity not only in the Philippines but in other countries in Southeast Asia such as Indonesia, Singapore, Malaysia and Thailand. He is currently an exclusive talent of GMA Network.

Bautista has also collaborated with fellow Filipino singers Nina, Sitti, Rachelle Ann Go, Sarah Geronimo, Sheryn Regis, Erik Santos and Mark Bautista. He regularly appears in ABS-CBN's variety show ASAP 18.

Bautista shot The Kitchen Musical with fellow Stages talent Karylle and other Asian and Filipino talents in Singapore.

After being with ABS-CBN for 10 years, Bautista transferred to GMA Network and signed a three-year exclusive contract on March 20, 2013.

Bautista renewed his contract with GMA Network on July 28, 2021.
He is currently an exclusive talent of GMA Network.

Life and music career

Childhood and youth
Bautista was born in Imus, Cavite, on October 19, 1981. He is the eldest of three siblings, sons of Josefa Rizalina and Ebert Bautista. He was a choir member in their church since he was seven years old.

Bautista studied grade school and high school at Imus Unida Christian School, which also hailed other Filipino actors such as Ryan Eigenmann, Geoff Eigenmann, Rico Yan and Billy Joe Crawford. He then took up landscape architecture at the University of the Philippines Diliman, graduating with a Bachelor of Arts degree. He was a table tennis varsity player during college before focusing on singing and entering showbiz.

2003–2004: Star in a Million and self-titled album
Bautista gained popularity after becoming the first grand finalist on ABS-CBN's reality singing competition Star in a Million. Though placing only fourth overall, he quickly become one of the most popular contestants, and was offered a recording contract with Warner Music Philippines shortly after he was eliminated from the show. He released the single "The Way You Look at Me", in 2004 from his self-titled album.

The song, penned by American composers Andrew Fromm and Keith Follese, received frequent airplay in Indonesian radio stations and Bautista became an instant hit overseas that record label Warner Indonesia decided to bring him there to perform for his growing Indonesian fanbase.

2005: Completely
Completely, Christian Bautista's second album, received a Platinum Record Award on its first week of release in the Philippines. The album spawned the singles "Everything You Do", "Invincible", and "She Could Be", a song which was later covered by Corbin Bleu of High School Musical fame. Completely has also reached platinum status in Indonesia.

A special edition of the album Completely, which combines Christian's English songs from his debut and second albums, was later launched in Singapore where "The Way You Look at Me" also topped local charts.

In 2005, RCTI aired a musical special entitled Completely: Christian Bautista where he performed with Indonesian artists 40-piece Magenta Orchestra, Andi Rianto, Krisdayanti and Titi DJ. In the same year, Bautista was cast as one of the leads in Kampanerang Kuba, a musical fantasy television series broadcast by ABS-CBN.

Banking on his massive following among young fans in Indonesia, Bautista has been tapped by San Miguel Corporation to endorse its new line of soft beverage products in the Asian region, starting with Indonesia. Christian also endorses a new mobile content provider based in Jakarta called Star SMS, and soon for Oishi food products in the Philippines, and Indonesia.

Locally, he had been endorsing brands such as Bench clothing and body spray, St. Augustine School of Nursing, Smart Communications, Greenwich Pizza, Trumpets Musicademy, Bed Head products, Skechers, and Swatch watches.

2006–2007: Just a Love Song...Live! and Inspired Tour
Bautista released his third major album, Just a Love Song... Christian Bautista Live! in 2006 also under the Warner Music Philippines. The album, the first live album by the singer, is mainly composed of covers of different old-time hit love songs and was recorded live in a Teatrino Bar in Greenhills with a small number of audience, which are mostly specially invited fans of the singer. Follow up to the success of the live album was the release of his very first live DVD under the same title in early 2007.

Bautista debuts as an actor on the big screen in Regal Entertainment's 2006 Metro Manila Film Festival entry Mano Po 5: Gua Ai Di. In this film directed by Joel Lamangan and written by Abi Lam-Parayno, Dode Cruz and Andrew Paredes, Christian plays Timothy a.k.a. Felix Yan, an Asian pop star, providing support to the bankable love team of Angel Locsin and Richard Gutierrez. The single "My Heart Has A Mind of Its Own" from "Completely" is used as one of the film's soundtrack.

He launched a four-city tour in Indonesia on January 26 to February 2, 2007. The tour included visits in Jakarta, Makassar, Surabaya, and Bandung.

In October 2007, he embarked a concert tour, Inspired, a one-night show in the Cuneta Astrodome with guest appearances by Gary Valenciano, Tricia Amper Jimenez, Joni Villanueva and Sam Milby.

He collaborated with Rachelle Ann Go on the song "Pag-ibig Na Kaya?", a Filipino version of "Perhaps Love" (originally sung by Howl & J), that was used in the Koreanovela Princess Hours, aired on ABS-CBN.

Bautista re-released Just a Love Song...Live including a CD of different Christmas songs.

2008: West Side Story and Captured 
Bautista was included in the Valentine Concert on February 13, 2007, Ol 4 Luv, which was held at the Araneta Coliseum with Rachelle Ann Go, Erik Santos and Sarah Geronimo.

Bautista's live album, Just a Love Song...Live!, sold close to Double Platinum following the release of the repackaged Christmas edition containing his rendition of Gary Valenciano's "Pasko Na Sinta Ko" as well as other Christmas songs.

A musical talk show starring Bautista, The Christian Bautista Show, also aired on the Makisig Network. Bautista also won the award for Favorite Musical Artist Act at the first Nickelodeon Kids Choice Awards Philippines, held in 2008.

Alongside Filipina singer Karylle, Bautista was also a part of the theatrical cast of West Side Story in 2008.

In July 2008, Bautista's third studio album Captured was released. The album features bossa nova singer Sitti.

2009: Romance Revisited
Early 2009, Bautista released his last single for Captured, Limutin Na Lang which featured a Music Video containing compilations of his videos and pictures from his past albums/album tours.

In 2009, Christian Bautista released his very first compilation, The Platinum Collection. It would be his last album released under Warner Music Philippines.

By early August 2009, Bautista had transferred to Universal Records. His first project under the recording label featured 19 tracks and songs originally performed by the legendary Jose Mari Chan. The album, Romance Revisited, rose to the top of the charts immediately after its release. Bautista performed several duets in the album, with popular pop stars Sarah Geronimo, Lani Misalucha and Regine Velasquez who early in her career also collaborated with Chan.

In November 2009, Bautista was a guest at Sarah Geronimo's Record Breaker Concert where they sang their duet "Please Be Careful with My Heart".

2010: Dahsyat and A Wonderful Christmas
In February 2010, Bautista appeared again in Dahsyat, an Indonesian variety show from RCTI in Jakarta, where he performed a duet with Indonesian singer Bunga Citra Lestari with an Indonesian version of "Please Be Careful with My Heart".

In November 2010, Bautista released his seventh overall album and first Christmas album under Universal Records, titled A Wonderful Christmas. On December 2, 2011, the album was certified Diamond by PARI.

2011: Outbound
Bautista released his fifth studio album and seventh overall album, Outbound, in 2011. He also joined the cast of a musical drama series, Kitchen Musical, with Karylle, Thou Reyes, Art Acuna.

2012
During the first quarter of the year, the First Class: Outbound Expanded Edition album was launched. Together with Karylle, they received top billing at the Love & Laughter concert at the Resorts World on February 29. Bautista remained active on Kitchen Musical for the 2012 season. In the third quarter of 2012, he was part of 10th anniversary special of The Way You Look at Me that celebrated his 10 year in the industry. Bautista was also featured on the series Princess and I, which aired on ABS-CBN during 2012. Bautista's sixth studio album, and eighth full-length X-Plus was released in October 2012.

2013–present: Transfer to the Kapuso Network
In March 2013, Bautista transferred to the GMA Network after months of rumors. He performed for the first time on Party Pilipinas on March 24, 2013, also marking the third anniversary of the show. He signed a three-year exclusive contract with GMA Network on March 20, 2013.

Theatre
Trumpet's production of The Lion, The Witch & The Wardrobe was Bautista's first big break. He earned raves from critics for his acting debut.

Discography

Studio albums
2004: Christian Bautista
2005: Completely
2008: Captured
2009: Romance Revisited: The Love Songs of Jose Mari Chan
2010: A Wonderful Christmas
2011: Outbound
2012: First Class: Outbound Expanded Edition
2012: X-Plus 
2014: Soundtrack
2017: Kapit

Other albums
2005: So It's You (Movie Soundtrack)
2005: Nasaan Ka Man (Movie Soundtrack)
2006: Just a Love Song... Christian Bautista Live!
2009: The Platinum Collection

Songs featured on CD releases by other artists
2003: Say That You Love Me (Star in a Million (album))
2004: Silent Night (All Star Christmas Collection)
2005: Burn (Nina Live)
2006: Dying To Tell You (ASAP Music)
2007: "Pag-ibig Na Kaya (Princess Hours OST)
2012: Faith (The Kitchen Musical OST)
2012: Nag-iisang Bituin (Princess and I OST)
2012: Gaano Kadalas ang Minsan (Walang Hanggan OST Volume 2)
2013: Maghihintay Sayo (Maghihintay Pa Rin OST)
2013: Ngiti (With A Smile OST)
2014: Up Where We Belong (Empress Ki OST)
2015: Sayo Lang Ang Aking Puso (My Mother's Secret OST)
2015: You And Me (Because Of You OST)
2016: Maghihintay with Gabbi Garcia (Encantadia 2016 OST)

DVD
2011: Romance Revisited: The Music Video Collection''

Filmography

Television

Awards and nominations

References

External links 
 Official Site
 

1981 births
Living people
People from Imus
Singers from Cavite
University of the Philippines Diliman alumni
21st-century Filipino male singers
Participants in Philippine reality television series
21st-century Filipino male actors
Filipino male television actors
Filipino male musical theatre actors
Filipino male models
Male actors from Cavite
Filipino evangelicals
Filipino Pentecostals
Universal Records (Philippines) artists
Warner Music Group artists
ABS-CBN personalities
Star Magic
GMA Network personalities
Filipino television personalities
Filipino television presenters
Filipino television variety show hosts